The Multicultural Center of the South, located in downtown Shreveport, Louisiana, has a wide range of entertainment, educational family activities and programs, including lectures, symposia, live musical performances and cultural tour programs.  The only institution of its kind in the state, it celebrates the 26 cultures in the Shreveport-Bossier area. The exhibits within the museum have sections dedicated to larger communities in the area, including  Pakistani, Filipino, Vietnamese, Greek, Scottish, Slavic, African-American, Hispanic/Latino, Native American, Jewish, Cajun and Creole cultural groups. It curates changing exhibits as well as featuring traveling exhibits from the Louisiana Art Museum.   It holds art and performance classes for children, cultural celebrations, and holiday events featuring different cultures.  

Together with Southern University Museum of Art, the Center is one of two sites in Shreveport designated among twenty-six featured destinations on the statewide Louisiana African American Heritage Trail. Lt. Governor Mitch Landrieu chose the Multicultural Center of the South as the site of his press conference to announce the Trail on February 28, 2008. Landrieu said, "What's unique about the trail is that we didn't go invest in new capital or buildings. We can't build anything more authentic than already exists."

Citations

External links
 Official Site of the Multicultural Center of the South
 Louisiana's African American Heritage Trail

Art museums and galleries in Louisiana
Ethnic museums in Louisiana
Louisiana African American Heritage Trail
Multiculturalism in the United States
Museums in Shreveport, Louisiana
Organizations based in Shreveport, Louisiana